PNC Bank Building is a  skyscraper on Capitol Square in Downtown Columbus, Ohio. It was completed in 1977 and has 24 floors. It is the 15th tallest building in Columbus. The building was designed by Skidmore, Owings & Merrill and follows a modernist architectural style.

See also
List of tallest buildings in Columbus

References

External links

Skyscraper office buildings in Columbus, Ohio
Buildings in downtown Columbus, Ohio
Skidmore, Owings & Merrill buildings
Office buildings completed in 1977
Bank buildings in Columbus, Ohio
Broad Street (Columbus, Ohio)